Ezequiel Montes is a municipality in Querétaro in central Mexico.

References

Municipalities of Querétaro